The following is an alphabetical list of members of the United States House of Representatives from the commonwealth of Kentucky.  For chronological tables of members of both houses of the United States Congress from the state (through the present day), see United States congressional delegations from Kentucky. The list of names should be complete as of June 4, 2020, but other data may be incomplete.

Current members
As of January 3, 2023

 : James Comer (R) (since 2016)
 : Brett Guthrie (R) (since 2009)
 : Morgan McGarvey (D) (since 2023)
 : Thomas Massie (R) (since 2012)
 : Hal Rogers (R) (since 1981)
 : Andy Barr (R) (since 2013)

List of members

See also

Kentucky's congressional districts
List of Confederate representatives from Kentucky
List of United States senators from Kentucky
United States congressional delegations from Kentucky

Sources
House of Representatives List of Members

Kentucky
 
United States rep